Feud of the Range is a 1939 American Western film produced and directed by Harry S. Webb and written by Carl Krusada. The film stars Bob Steele, Richard Cramer, Gertrude Messinger, Frank LaRue, Jean Cranford and Bob Burns. The film was released on January 15, 1939, by Metropolitan Pictures Corporation.

Plot
Barton and Dirk create a range war between the Gray and Allen ranches in order to get the ranchers to sell out to them so they can sell the land to the railroad. Sheriff Waters sends for Tom Gray's son Bob to speak to his father about stopping the war. The Sheriff deputises Bob and his sidekick Happy.

Cast           
Bob Steele as Bob Gray
Richard Cramer as Tom Gray
Gertrude Messinger as Madge Allen
Frank LaRue as Harvey Allen
Jean Cranford as Helen Wilson
Bob Burns as Pop Wilson 
Budd Buster as Happy 
Jack Ingram as Clyde Barton
Charles King as Dirk
Duke R. Lee as Sheriff Cal Waters

References

External links
 

1939 films
1930s English-language films
American Western (genre) films
1939 Western (genre) films
Films directed by Harry S. Webb
American black-and-white films
Films with screenplays by George H. Plympton
1930s American films